Marco Visconti may refer to:

 Marco Visconti (novel), an 1834 novel by Tommaso Grossi
 Marco Visconti (1925 film), a silent film adaptation directed by Aldo De Benedetti
 Marco Visconti (1941 film), a sound film adaptation directed by Mario Bonnard 
 Marco Visconti (TV series), a 1975 television adaptation
 Marco Visconti (occultist), an Italian occultist consecrated to the episcopate by Michael Bertiaux